The Bluegrass Bowl was a college football bowl game that was played only once, on December 13, 1958, at Cardinal Stadium (later known as "Old Cardinal Stadium") in Louisville, Kentucky. The Oklahoma State Cowboys defeated Florida State Seminoles, 15–6.

Background of the Bluegrass Bowl
Game organizers expected the Bluegrass Bowl to be an annual event in Louisville, starting with the 1958 contest. The first choices for the game were the Kentucky Wildcats and the Alabama Crimson Tide, which went 5–4–1 in its first season under Bear Bryant, who had previously coached at Kentucky for eight seasons. Kentucky's players voting to turn down bowl bids was nothing new: they said no to the Gator Bowl in 1953, despite a 7–2–1 record in Bryant's final season in Lexington, and again in 1954 after going 7–3. Alabama also declined; Oklahoma State and Florida State accepted invitations.

Bowl organizers successfully negotiated a national television contract with American Broadcasting Company (ABC), with a 100-mile blackout (at the time, ABC held only a secondary affiliation in Louisville with primary CBS affiliate WHAS-TV). A crowd of 15,000, less than half capacity, was expected for the inaugural game. Tickets were priced at $6.50 each, though due to unenthusiastic demand they were being sold for $1.50 on the day of the game. Parking cost 25 cents.

Game results

1958 Bluegrass Bowl

Oklahoma State entered the game ranked #19 in the AP Poll, while Florida State was unranked. Florida State was an independent with a 7–3 regular season record; Oklahoma State was also 7–3 as an independent, having left the Missouri Valley Conference after the 1956 season and not joining the Big Eight Conference until 1960. Florida State, in their final season under head coach Tom Nugent, made in their third bowl game. Oklahoma State, coached by Cliff Speegle, was appearing in its fourth bowl game.

The game was played at Cardinal Stadium on the grounds of the Kentucky Exposition Center, just behind Freedom Hall, where that year's NCAA basketball championship had been held. Kickoff was at 1:30 p.m., with a game time temperature of 20 °F, and falling. The playing field was icy and slippery, causing the players to forego cleats and wear tennis shoes instead. The cold weather on top of the general indifference to the contest kept the attendance low; crowd estimates were in the 5,000–10,000 range, and many accounts state that just over 7,000 attended.

In the first quarter, Florida State took two drives into Oklahoma State territory but missed 16 and 23-yard field goal attempts.

Early in the second quarter, Oklahoma State halfback Duane Wood ran 17 yards for a score, putting the Cowboys up 7–0. Late in the second quarter Oklahoma State again drove deep into Florida State territory but on fourth and 5 Florida State defender Ron Hinson stripped the ball from Oklahoma State's Forrest Campbell just a foot from the goal line.

Florida State fumbled twice in the third quarter. Oklahoma State took the second fumble for a 10-play, 39 yard touchdown drive capped by another Duane Wood touchdown run. Wood then caught a pass for a two-point conversion to give Oklahoma State a 15–0 lead.

Florida State scored a fourth-quarter touchdown without a successful conversion, giving Oklahoma State a 15–6 win.

Media coverage
ABC's coverage of the otherwise forgettable Bluegrass Bowl was notable for two reasons: it was the last broadcast of Harry Wismer and the first national telecast to feature Howard Cosell. It was also the first-ever national broadcast of a Florida State football game. Due to the cold weather, the press covering the game deserted the windowless press box and all crowded into a single enclosed, heated room with windows for the game.

Aftermath
In January 1959 officials stated that paid attendance for the game was 3,152 and actual income was $18,132. The Bluegrass Bowl organizers proclaimed the game a success despite the low attendance and stated that the game would be played again in 1959, but it was not.

Statistics

Scoring Summary
OSU - D. Wood 17 yd. run (J. Wood kick), 14:31
OSU - D. Wood 1 yd. run (D. Wood pass from Soergel), :07
FSU - Meyer 39 yd. pass from Majors (Prinzi run failed), 13:52

Statistics

Individual Statistics
Rushing
Florida State
Pickard galloped 14 times for 44 yards. Vic Prinzi rushed 7 times for 30 yards. Renn ran 2 times for 13 yards. Majors went for 12 yards on 3 carries. Whitehead had just one yard on 1 carry. McCormack gained 0 yards on one try.

Oklahoma State
Campbell rushed 26 times for 130 yards. D. Wood went for 81 yards on 17 carries for two touchdowns. Wiggins galloped 12 times for 59 yards. Banfield ran 7 times for 34 yards. Rundele had 3 carries for 7 yards. Sewell ran for 3 yards on 4 carries. Wagner had just 1 yard on his one carry. Cross and Soergel both lost yards on their only carries, the former losing 5 and the latter losing 12.

Passing
Florida State
Majors went 5 for 9 passing with a touchdown and interception each and 116 yards. Prinzi went 3 for 8 with 3 interceptions and 44 yards. McCormack went 1 for 4 passing with 25 yards. Lastly, Renn went 0 for 1 passing.

Oklahoma State
Soergel went 6 for 12 passing with 1 interception and 77 yards.

Receiving
Florida State
Romeo had 3 catches for 62 yards. Espenship caught 2 passes for 22 yards. Renn received 2 catches for 48 yards. Meyer snatched 1 pass for 39 yards, which proved to be the only Seminole touchdown. Lastly, Pasqual had 1 catch for 14 yards.

Oklahoma State
Wiggins had 2 catches for 38 yards. D. Wood caught 2 passes for 23 yards. Harkey received 1 catch for 7 yards. Lastly, J. Wood had 1 catch for 9 yards.

See also
 History of Louisville, Kentucky
 List of college bowl games

References

Further reading
 Hill, Bob, "1958 saw birth and death of 2 bowl ideas", 'Louisville Courier-Journal', December 31, 2005, page B1, online at http://www.courier-journal.com/apps/pbcs.dll/article?AID=/20051231/COLUMNISTS05/512310375/1008/NEWS01
 Rice, Russell, "The Wildcats: Kentucky Football", a book about University of Kentucky football history

Defunct college football bowls
1958–59 NCAA football bowl games
Florida State Seminoles football bowl games
Oklahoma State Cowboys football bowl games
History of Louisville, Kentucky
Sports competitions in Louisville, Kentucky
December 1958 sports events in the United States
1958 in sports in Kentucky